As one of the largest cities in the Commonwealth of Massachusetts, Lowell has produced many notable people in various fields:

Academics, science, and engineering 
 George Bassett Clark, Astronomer (reflective telescope)
 Samuel Luther Dana, Chemist and consultant to the Merrimack Manufacturing Company 
 Helen Sawyer Hogg, Astronomer
 Louis Olney, Professor of Chemistry at the Lowell Technological Institute; founder and first president of the American Association of Textile Chemists and Colorists
 Reverend Frederick Foley, President of Providence College  1945–1947
 Roger Boisjoly, Mechanical engineer, fluid dynamicist, and an aerodynamicist. Winner of the AAAS Award for Scientific Freedom and Responsibility in 1988 for raising concerns about material defects which were ignored by Morton Thiokol that resulted in the Space Shuttle Challenger Disaster.

Law 

 Stanley Elroy Qua, Chief Justice of the Massachusetts Supreme Judicial Court
 Frederick Aiken, lawyer and Civil War veteran, defense attorney for Mary Surratt
 Alice Parker Lesser, 1880s-1900 lawyer who published many articles, and procured legislation for the property-owning rights of women
 Loren W. Collins, Minnesota jurist and legislator

Military service 

 Charles Herbert Allen, Representative to U.S. Congress, 4 March 1885 – 3 March 1889, Secretary of the Navy 1898–1900, Governor of Puerto Rico 1900–1902
 Adelbert Ames, Governor 1868–1870,1874–1876 and Senator from Mississippi 1870–1874, Union general in the Civil War and the Spanish–American War, son-in-law of Benjamin Franklin Butler
 Benjamin Franklin Butler, Congressman 1867–1879, Union general in the Civil War, Governor of Massachusetts 1883–1884, and Greenback Party presidential candidate 1884, for whom the Butler School is named
 Gustavus Fox, Assistant Secretary of the Navy during the Civil War
 Mary Hallaren, Director of Women's Army Corps
 David H. McNerney, Medal of Honor recipient, Vietnam
 Ryan M. Pitts, Medal of Honor recipient, Afghanistan
 Joseph A. Sladen, Union Army Medal of Honor recipient, raised in Lowell
 Charles Sweeney, USAF Major who piloted the B-29 Bockscar on its mission to drop the Fat Man nuclear weapon on Nagasaki, 
 Edgar A. Wedgwood, sheriff of Hall County, Nebraska and adjutant general of the Utah National Guard
 Henry Pantojamatta, Former 3 time New England Golden Glove Champion and U.S. Army Command Sergeant Major; the highest possible rank for an enlisted soldier in the U.S. Army.

Politics and public service 

 Benjamin Dean, Congressman 1878–1879
 Frederic Thomas Greenhalge, Congressman 1889–1891, for whom the Greenhalge Elementary School is named. 
 Allen Hobbs, Charles H. Allen's grandson, 32nd Governor of American Samoa 1944–1945, 35th Hydrographer of the United States Navy 1948–1950s
 Maurice K. Goddard, Secretary of the Pennsylvania Department of Conservation and Natural Resources, a driving force in creating 45 Pennsylvania state parks in his 24 years in office
 Walker Lewis, African-American abolitionist and early Mormon Elder
 Marty Meehan, Congressman 1993–2007, current President of the University of Massachusetts 
 Addison W. Merrill, Wisconsin State Assemblyman 1897
 Rady Mom, Massachusetts House of Representatives
 Frank B. Morse, Republican; Congressman 1961–1972, for whom the Morse Elementary School is named 
 Patrick O. Murphy, the youngest Mayor in the city's history, elected at age 29 in January 2012.
 Robert Preston, New Hampshire State Senator and businessman
 John Jacob Rogers, Republican; Congressman 1913–1925 
 Parlan Semple, Wisconsin State Assemblyman 1869–1871
 Ezekiel A. Straw, Governor of New Hampshire 1872–1874
 Nancy Achin Sullivan, Massachusetts state senator
 Niki Tsongas, Congresswoman 2007–2019
 Paul Tsongas, Congressman 1975–1979, U.S. Senator 1979–1985, and Democratic presidential candidate 1992, for whom the Tsongas Arena is named
 Emma Wolfe, Deputy Mayor of New York City and chief of staff to Bill de Blasio

Industry, invention and business 
 Frederick Ayer (1822), industrialist, investor, first president of the American Woolen Company
 Dr. James Cook Ayer (1818), industrialist, patent medicine tycoon
 Kirk Boott (1790–1837), industrialist, for whom the Boott Mills and Kirk Street are named
 Milton Bradley, founder of the Milton Bradley Company, developed board games
 Fred C. Church, founder of Fred C. Church Insurance
 Telemachus & George Demoulas, grocery store tycoons
 James B. Francis, pioneer of American civil engineering for whom the Francis Locks are named
 Daniel Gage, Gage Ice Company, for whom Gage Park and Gage Street are named
 Ted Leonsis, billionaire who worked at Wang labs
Augustin Thompson, a physician, businessman and philanthropist who created the Moxie soft drink
 An Wang, inventor and businessman, for whom the Wang Middle School is named

Astronautics 
 Richard M. Linnehan, NASA astronaut 1992–present; five space missions to date, including Hubble Space Telescope upgrades and repairs

Literature and entertainment 
 Michael Ansara, actor
 Nicholas A. Basbanes, author and cultural historian (A Gentle Madness, On Paper)
 Michael Casey, poet
 Michael Chiklis, Emmy Award and Golden Globe Award-winning actor
 Cora Linn Daniels, writer
 Bette Davis, Academy Award-winning actress
 George Washington Dixon, entertainer and newspaper editor
 Olympia Dukakis, Academy Award-winning actress (Moonstruck)
 Mark Goddard, actor (Lost in Space)
 Lance Wilder, animator and background designer mostly known for work on The Simpsons
 Ray Goulding, radio comedian (of Bob & Ray)
 James P. Hogan, film director
 Deborah Hopkinson, children's author
 Nancy Kelly, Tony Award-winning actress, nominated for Academy Award and Emmy Awards (36 movies)
 Jack Kerouac, writer (On the Road), for whom the downtown park is named
 Jonathan Lemire, host of Way Too Early with Jonathan Lemire
 Elinor Lipman, writer, columnist The Boston Globe
 Ed McMahon, entertainer, announcer, actor
 Matt Mira, comedian, The Nerdist Podcast
Giuseppina Morlacchi, ballerina, dancer, and actress who introduced the can-can to the American stage
 Louis Phillips, author, poet, and dramatist
 Maryann Plunkett, actor
 José Carlos Rodrigues, Brazilian journalist
 Tom Sexton, writer
 Harriette Lucy Robinson Shattuck (1850-1937), author, writer on parliamentary law, suffragist
 Paul Sullivan, sports radio personality WBZ and columnist for Lowell Sun
 Robert Tessier, actor and stuntman
 Vince Vouyer, porn star
 Jujubee, drag performer, Season 2 of Rupaul’s Drag Race

Music 
 Scott Grimes, voice actor and singer
 Bob Bachelder, orchestra leader and educator
 Gary Hoey, guitar player
 George Whitefield Chadwick, composer
 Rosalind Elias, opera singer
 Hell Within, hardcore/metal band from Lowell
 PVRIS, alternative rock band
 Professor Lyrical, rapper and professor
 The Shods, rock band from Lowell - were awarded the Key to City of Lowell.
Vein, metalcore band
John Kellette, songwriter, actor, director. Famous song he wrote was I'm Forever Blowing Bubbles.
Boney James, saxophonist, songwriter, and record producer.
Astronoid, post-metal band.

Arts and design 
 Charles H. Allen, painter and 1st governor of Puerto Rico
 Margaret Foley (1820–1877), sculptor
 Adelia Sarah Gates (c. 1823–1912), botanical illustrator and watercolorist
 David Hilliard (1964- ), photographer
 Thomas B. Lawson (1807–1888), landscape painter
 Christopher Makos (1948- ), photographer, artist
 Willard Leroy Metcalf (1858–1925), Impressionist painter
 David Dalhoff Neal (1838–1915), portrait painter
 Alfred Ordway (1821–1897), landscape painter
 William Preston Phelps (1848–1917), landscape painter
 Frederick W. Stickney (1854–1918), architect, master of stone architecture
 James McNeill Whistler (1834–1903), painter and etcher
 Sarah W. Whitman (1842–1904), artist, illustrator, stained glass designer, and author

Sports

Basketball 
Harry "Bucky" Lew is best known for becoming the first African-American professional basketball player when he joined the New England League in 1902.
 Terance Mann, current NBA player for the Los Angeles Clippers, grew up in Lowell. Mann played for the Florida State Seminoles before being drafted 48th overall in the second round of the 2019 NBA draft. Mann grew in popularity after a breakout playoff run, scoring 39 points against the Utah Jazz in game 6 of the Clippers' second round series in 2021.

Football 
 Steve Alexakos, lineman for Denver Broncos 1970, New York Giants 1971
 Bill Cooke, defensive line for Green Bay Packers 1975, San Francisco 49ers 1976–77, Detroit Lions 1978, and Seattle Seahawks 1978–1980
 John Blake Galvin, Jr., linebacker for New York Jets 1988–1991
 Bruce Laird, Pro Bowl cornerback for Baltimore Colts 1972–1983
 Menil Mavraides, offensive lineman for Philadelphia Eagles 1954, 1957
 Ray McLean, halfback for Chicago Bears 1940–1948, Head Coach of the Green Bay Packers 1953,1958
 John Miller, lineman for Washington Redskins 1956–1960
 Anthony Prior, gridiron football player
 Ray Riddick, end for the Green Bay Packers from 1940 to 1946, for whom the High School Gymnasium is named
 Billy Sullivan, owner of New England Patriots from 1960 to 1988 
 Robert Joseph Sullivan, running back for San Francisco 49ers 1948

Baseball 
 Mike Balas, pitched one game for the Boston Bees in 1938
 Johnny Barrett, outfielder for the Pittsburgh Pirates, 1942–1946 
 Skippy Roberge, infielder for the Boston Braves, 1941–1942, 1946

Hockey 
 Jon Morris, center for New Jersey Devils 1984–1992, Boston Bruins 1993

Boxing 
 Dicky Eklund, pro boxer 1975–1985, welterweight 
 Tommy Ellis, boxer, 1952–1962, known for a long series of epic showdowns on Dumont Network Thursday Night Fights in Lowell against Tony "The Bus" Gilbrecki
 Ralph Lally, New England Golden Gloves Champion, Light Heavyweight-175lbs., 1970
 Micky Ward, pro boxer 1985–2003, junior welterweight

Olympic athletes 
 Ethan Thomas Brown, 2007 and 2008 U23 Triathlon National Champion 2012 USA Olympic development team roster
 Shelagh Donohoe, 1992 Barcelona, took silver medal in rowing (Women's Coxless Fours), current URI head coach
 Ernest N. Harmon, 1924 Paris, finished 31st in Modern Pentathlon (5th in shooting); U.S. Army Major General in World War II;  President of Norwich University 1950–1956
 Nathaniel Jenkins, 12th IAAF World Championships in Athletics Berlin 2009; 7th in 2008 USA Olympic Team trials
 Alfons Mello Travers, 1924 Paris, finished 5th in Men's Welterweight Boxing, turned pro and finished 37/10 with 18 KOs; retired as a restaurant owner in Lowell

Other sports 
 Louis Cyr, French-Canadian strongman, lived in Lowell from 1878 to 1883
 Billy Pappas, professional foosball player. Born in Lowell, Sept. 28, 1984.
 Manny Santiago, professional skateboarder

Other 
 Thaddeus Mortimer Fowler, cartographer
 Roger Morin, Bishop
 William Henry O'Connell, Cardinal, Archdiocese of Boston
 Lucy Robbins Messer Switzer (1844-1922), temperance activist

References 

  "Howl Magazine - Music, Art, Life "Come Out and Play". Hhowlmag.com.

Lowell, Massachusetts
 
Lowell, Mass